Sergei Aleksandrovich Yevin (born 2 July 1977) is a former Russian professional football player.

Club career
He played two seasons in the Russian Football National League for FC Lada Togliatti and FC Volga Ulyanovsk.

References

External links
 

1977 births
Living people
Russian footballers
Association football midfielders
Association football forwards
FC Lada-Tolyatti players
FC Orenburg players
FC Volga Ulyanovsk players